A. K. Aranganathan is an Indian politician and was a member of the 14th Tamil Nadu Legislative Assembly from the Kilpennathur constituency. He represented the All India Anna Dravida Munnetra Kazhagam party.

He was defeated in the elections of 2016 by K. Pitchandi. A.k.Aranganathan is  only the first defeated the  k.pitchandi in 2011.the history were created by him, k.pitchandi he's only win in kilpennathur constituency but A.K.Aranganathan were broke his record.

References 

Tamil Nadu MLAs 2011–2016
All India Anna Dravida Munnetra Kazhagam politicians
Living people
Year of birth missing (living people)